The 2019 European Fencing Championships was held in Düsseldorf, Germany from 17 to 22 June 2019 at the Messe Düsseldorf hall 8b.

Schedule

Medal summary

Men's events

Women's events

Medal table

Results

Men

Foil individual

Épée individual

Sabre individual

Foil team

Épée team

Sabre team

Women

Foil individual

Épée individual

Sabre individual

Épée team

Foil team

Sabre team

References

External links
Official website
Results 

European Fencing Championships
European Fencing Championships
International fencing competitions hosted by Germany
European Fencing Championships
European Fencing Championships
Sports competitions in Düsseldorf
2010s in Düsseldorf